is a passenger railway station in the city of Sōsa, Chiba Japan, operated by the East Japan Railway Company (JR East).

Lines

Station layout
Igura Station has a single side platform, serving bi-directional traffic. The platform is short, and can only accommodate trains of eight carriages or less in length. The station is unattended.

History
Iigura Station was opened on 1 October 1964 as a passenger station on the Japan National Railways (JNR). The station was absorbed into the JR East network upon the privatization of the Japan National Railways on 1 April 1987. A new station building was completed in December 2000.

Passenger statistics
In fiscal 2006, the station was used by an average of 449 passengers daily

Surrounding area

See also
 List of railway stations in Japan

References

External links

 JR East station information 

Railway stations in Japan opened in 1964
Railway stations in Chiba Prefecture
Sōbu Main Line
Sōsa